Threnody to the Victims of Hiroshima, also translated as Threnody for the Victims of Hiroshima, is a musical composition for 52 string instruments composed  in 1961 by Krzysztof Penderecki. Dedicated to the residents of Hiroshima killed and injured by the first-ever wartime usage of an atomic weapon, the composition won the Tribune Internationale des Compositeurs UNESCO prize that same year.

Description 
The 52 string instruments indicated in the piece's full title are 24 violins, 10 violas, 10 cellos and 8 double basses. The piece's written length is about 8 minutes and 37 seconds. Originally called 8'37", the piece applies the sonoristic technique which tends to focus on specific characteristics and qualities of timbre, texture, articulation, dynamics, and motion in an attempt to create freer form, and rigors of specific counterpoint to an ensemble of strings treated to unconventional scoring. Penderecki's stated intent with the composition was to "develop a new musical language". Penderecki later said, "It existed only in my imagination, in a somewhat abstract way." When he heard an actual performance, "I was struck by the emotional charge of the work ... I searched for associations and, in the end, I decided to dedicate it to the Hiroshima victims".

The 52 string instruments meld together in sonoristic manipulation and counterpoint in a manner which, according to reviewer Paul Griffiths, makes the listener "uneasy by choosing to refer to an event too terrible for string orchestral screams". Threnody's sustained tone clusters and various extended techniques – including a riot of varying vibrato, slapped instruments, playing on the tailpiece and behind the bridge – are matched by an optical notation full of thick black lines. At times Penderecki takes an aleatoric approach, offering the players a choice of techniques or demanding irregular degrees of vibrato. The piece is also marked by a considerable rigor in its timing indications, notated in seconds, as well as specific note clusters and the use of quarter tones, clustered pitches and sound mass which accumulates in a reservoir of hypertonality.

It is also an example of the composer's "sensualist" Neo-Romantic style.

Usage in media 
Excerpts from Threnody to the Victims of Hiroshima have been used in Alfonso Cuarón's 2006 film Children of Men, Wes Craven's 1991 social thriller The People Under the Stairs, David Lynch's 2017 television series Twin Peaks, and Gerry Anderson's 1969 film Journey to the Far Side of the Sun. In music, excerpts from Threnody to the Victims of Hiroshima are sampled in one version of Manic Street Preachers's 1991 song You Love Us and in SebastiAn's 2010 release Bird Games.

See also 
 Bowed string instrument extended technique

Notes

References 

1961 compositions
Compositions by Krzysztof Penderecki
Compositions for string orchestra
Compositions that use extended techniques
Laments
Works about the atomic bombings of Hiroshima and Nagasaki